Reteporella grimaldii is a species of bryozoans in the family Phidoloporidae.

References

External links
 

Cheilostomatida
Animals described in 1903